Jack Conte (born July 12, 1984) is an American musician and co-founder and CEO of Patreon. He is one half of the band Pomplamoose, along with his wife Nataly Dawn, co-leader of the band Scary Pockets, and leader of the band Magaziine.

Career
Conte created his YouTube channel in 2007 to upload music videos inspired by the Dogme 95 movement. He gained widespread attention when his video Yeah Yeah Yeah was featured on YouTube's front page. Most of Conte's music videos follow a format called "VideoSongs", defined by two rules: no lip-syncing for instruments or voice ("what you see is what you hear") and no hidden sounds ("if you hear it, at some point you see it").

In 2008, Conte formed the band Pomplamoose with Nataly Dawn, who later became his wife. The band garnered significant fan support, primarily through their YouTube videos.

Much of Conte's work has been met with positive reviews, citing evocative lyrics in Sleep in Color and creative delivery of his VideoSongs. However, Conte's music was reviewed less favorably by Amplifier: "Hints of Conor Oberst, Radiohead, Patrick Watson, contemporary punk rock (screamo), radio power pop, and incalculable other singer songwriters are more than borrowed, making for a short mishmash of electro rock."

On May 7, 2013, Conte announced the launch of Patreon with co-founder Samuel Yam. Conte called his company "Kickstarter for people who release stuff on a regular basis." In 2020, Conte was named a "Young Global Leader" by World Economic Forum.

In 2022, Conte formed the synth-pop band Magaziine.

Personal life
Conte was born in San Francisco although he grew up in Marin County, California. He studied music and composition at Stanford University, graduating in 2006. Conte and Nataly Dawn became engaged in January 2016 and married in May 2016.

Discography

Albums

Studio albums

Compilation albums

Extended plays

Singles

Music videos

References

External links
 

1984 births
Living people
21st-century American guitarists
21st-century American keyboardists
21st-century accordionists
21st-century American singers
American accordionists
American drummers
American multi-instrumentalists
American male guitarists
American male pianists
American male singer-songwriters
American percussionists
American YouTubers
Guitarists from San Francisco
21st-century American pianists
21st-century American drummers
21st-century American male singers
Pomplamoose members
Singer-songwriters from California